Jason Mederic Ratcliff (born December 8, 1967) is an American NASCAR crew chief, who is employed by Joe Gibbs Racing and is the crew chief for their No. 19 Toyota Supra in the NASCAR Xfinity Series, driven by multiple drivers. He has worked for JGR since 2005 and prior to that was a crew chief for Brewco Motorsports and a pit crew member with LAR Motorsports and Sadler Brothers Racing. He is the 2009 NASCAR Nationwide Series championship-winning crew chief, winning the championship with driver Kyle Busch.

Career

Early career

Crew member
He began his career in racing working on mini Sprint Cars in Texas, before he was hired for his first job in NASCAR in 1995, Sadler Brothers Racing, based in Nashville, Tennessee. While at SBR, he was a mechanic and rear tire changer for drivers Chuck Bown and Gary Bradberry in the Busch Series. He worked there for only two years before joining at Columbia, Tennessee-based LAR Motorsports as a chief mechanic for Casey Atwood and Jeff Purvis during the 1997 and 1998 seasons.

1999–2004: Brewco Motorsports
In 1999, Ratcliff got his first crew chiefing job. He moved from LAR to Brewco Motorsports to become the crew chief for rookie Casey Atwood. After working as the crew chief for him two years, Atwood moved to the Cup Series with Evernham Motorsports, and was replaced by Jamie McMurray, who became Ratcliff's new driver. During the 2003 and 2004 seasons, he became the crew chief for David Green. While together they won three races, achieved 11 top-fives, 21 top-10s and two pole positions, which resulted in a second place in the final standings, 14 points behind Brian Vickers. By the end of their relationship, they scored seven wins and seven pole positions.

2005–present: Joe Gibbs Racing

In 2005, Ratcliff moved to Joe Gibbs Racing as the crew chief for J. J. Yeley. He remained the crew chief for Yeley until 2006. During the two years, Jason Ratcliff was able to achieve 13 top-fives and 34 top-10 finishes. During the next season, Ratcliff was the crew chief for three different drivers: Aric Almirola, Brad Coleman and Kevin Conway, in which they earned two poles, four top-fives and five top-10s.

In 2008, he was the crew chief for Kyle Busch and Denny Hamlin, which were both drivers of the No. 18. He was able to win five races total during the season, four with Busch and one with Hamlin. During 2009, Kyle Busch became the full-time driver of the 18. Ratcliff and Busch won the championship, with nine wins, 11 runner-up finishes, 25 top fives and 2,698 laps led. With their teamwork, Busch was able to lead in all the races except for three. They also led more than 50 percent of the laps in a race an twelve times. Busch led the series points standings after 30 of the 35 events, including the last 29 weeks of the season, leaving little room for doubt in the championship chase. 

After seven years being the crew chief for the No. 18 Nationwide Series car, Ratcliff was announced to replace Greg Zipadelli as the crew chief of the No. 20  Joe Gibbs Racing Sprint Cup Series car, driven by Joey Logano, on December 16, 2011. In 2013, Ratcliff served as crew chief for Matt Kenseth, but was suspended for one race after the No. 20 engine failed postrace inspection following Kenseth's victory in the STP 400.

On September 24, 2019, after two successful Xfinity Series seasons, Ratcliff and driver Christopher Bell were announced to move to the Leavine Family Racing No. 95 Toyota for the 2020 Cup season. LFR closed down at the end of the 2020 season, so in 2021, Ratcliff returned to his former job as crew chief of the No. 20 Xfinity Series team for JGR, now driven by Harrison Burton.

Personal life
Ratcliff moved six times throughout his childhood, starting in Sumter, South Carolina, where he was born, and ending in Westlake, Louisiana, where he graduated from Westlake High School and began his racing career working on mini Sprint Cars. After high school, he moved again to Texas, where he continued to work on mini Sprint Cars for the next nine years before his first job in NASCAR in 1995. The first two NASCAR teams he worked for were based in Tennessee, so he moved there from Texas. Ratcliff currently lives in Huntersville, North Carolina (in the Charlotte metropolitan area where most NASCAR teams are based) with his wife, Christi, and two children, Cade and Dakota.

References

External links
 

Sportspeople from Sumter, South Carolina
NASCAR crew chiefs
1967 births
Living people
People from Westlake, Louisiana
People from Huntersville, North Carolina